Carmen Garayalde Zubizarreta (August 8, 1913 – September 8, 2002) was an Uruguayan teacher, exiled political activist, and artist.

Biography
Carmen Garayalde was born on August 8, 1913 in Montevideo, Uruguay to a financially secure family of Basque immigrants. In her youth, she studied singing and the violin, and would join the chamber orchestra of José Pedro Massera, formed by the friends and family of Massera Lerena, as a singer.

She would also take lessons in painting and engraving from Cecilia Marcovich, and María Carmen Portela. Under Portela's direction, Garayalde began to develop the graphic technique of the drypoint.

Garayalde had a close friendship with Amalia Polleri, with whom she made a poster that unanimously won a contest held by the Commission of Ladies to send humanitarian aid to Spain in 1937. Two years later, the two women appeared at a show organized by Demetrio Urruchúa held at the Plaza de Cagancha.

Citations

1913 births
2002 deaths
Uruguayan communists
Uruguayan women artists
Uruguayan people of Basque descent